The Dilke Baronetcy, of Sloane Street in the County of Middlesex, is a title in the Baronetage of the United Kingdom. It was created on 22 January 1862 for the Liberal politician Wentworth Dilke. Apart from his political career, he played an important part in the international exhibititions in London in 1851 and 1862. Dilke was the son of the critic and writer on literature Charles Wentworth Dilke. He was succeeded by his son, the second Baronet. He was also a Liberal politician and served under William Ewart Gladstone as Parliamentary Under-Secretary of State for Foreign Affairs from 1880 to 1882 and as President of the Local Government Board from 1882 to 1885. However, his political career was effectively ended in 1885 after a well-publicised divorce case.

The Dilke family is descended from Fisher Dilke, son of Thomas Dilke, of Maxstoke Castle, who married Sybil Wentworth.

Oswald A.W. Dilke, son of Clement Wentworth Dilke, younger brother of the fourth Baronet, was a classical scholar and philologist.

Dilke baronets, of Sloane Street (1862)
Sir (Charles) Wentworth Dilke, 1st Baronet (1810–1869)
Sir Charles Wentworth Dilke, 2nd Baronet (1843–1911)
Sir Charles Wentworth Dilke, 3rd Baronet (1874–1918)
Sir Fisher Wentworth Dilke, 4th Baronet (1877–1944)
Sir John Fisher Wentworth Dilke, 5th Baronet (1906–1998)
The Rev. Sir Charles John Wentworth Dilke, Cong. Orat. 6th Baronet (1937–2022), priest of the London Oratory
Sir Timothy Fisher Wentworth Dilke, presumed 6th Baronet (born 1938), a rheumatologist in London.  

The heir apparent to the baronetcy is his Sir Timothy’s son, Felix Wentworth Dilke (born 1967).

Notes

References
Kidd, Charles, Williamson, David (editors). Debrett's Peerage and Baronetage (1990 edition). New York: St Martin's Press, 1990, 

 http://www.thepeerage.com/p37027.htm

Baronetcies in the Baronetage of the United Kingdom